Jamie Pryor, better known as Jay Pryor, is an Irish producer, DJ, songwriter and remixer.

Career 
Jay Pryor has worked as a songwriter and producer with artists such as Louis Tomlinson, Steve Aoki, Digital Farm Animals, and more. Steve Aoki and Louis Tomlinson's single "Just Hold On", which Pryor co-produced, charted at number 2 on the official UK Singles Chart. Jay Pryor has provided official remixes for acts such as Kehlani & Ty Dolla $ign, Niall Horan, Seeb, Bastille, Snakehips, Zayn, American Authors, Anne-Marie, and DJ Fresh.

Jay Pryor's debut track "All This" and was released in 2016 and has been streamed more than 20 million times online. He signed a record deal with Virgin EMI Records in 2017 and his records are released by Casablanca Records in the US.

Discography

Singles

Songs produced by Jay Pryor

References 

Living people
Irish songwriters
DJs from Dublin (city)
1995 births